Ratamosa is a census-designated place (CDP) in Cameron County, Texas, United States. The population was 254 at the 2010 census. It is part of the Brownsville–Harlingen Metropolitan Statistical Area.

Geography
Ratamosa is located in western Cameron County at  (26.206570, -97.849640).

Demographics
As of the census of 2000, there were 218 people, 71 households, and 56 families residing in the CDP. The population density was 108.5 people per square mile (41.9/km2). There were 115 housing units at an average density of 57.2/sq mi (22.1/km2). The racial makeup of the CDP was 81.19% White, 1.83% Native American, 16.51% from other races, and 0.46% from two or more races. Hispanic or Latino of any race were 73.39% of the population.

There were 71 households, out of which 31.0% had children under the age of 18 living with them, 62.0% were married couples living together, 9.9% had a female householder with no husband present, and 21.1% were non-families. 15.5% of all households were made up of individuals, and 5.6% had someone living alone who was 65 years of age or older. The average household size was 3.07 and the average family size was 3.46.

In the CDP, the population was spread out, with 26.6% under the age of 18, 8.7% from 18 to 24, 25.2% from 25 to 44, 26.6% from 45 to 64, and 12.8% who were 65 years of age or older. The median age was 37 years. For every 100 females, there were 86.3 males. For every 100 females age 18 and over, there were 95.1 males.

The median income for a household in the CDP was $85,000, and the median income for a family was $85,000. Males had a median income of $51,667 versus $8,250 for females. The per capita income for the CDP was $22,302. About 21.7% of families and 25.6% of the population were below the poverty line, including none of those under the age of eighteen and 56.7% of those 65 or over.

Education
Ratamosa is served by the La Feria Independent School District.

In addition, South Texas Independent School District operates magnet schools that serve the community.

References

Census-designated places in Cameron County, Texas
Census-designated places in Texas